William Charles Nation (18 February 1840 – 29 May 1930) was a New Zealand printer, journalist, newspaper proprietor, spiritualist and tree planter.

He was born in Australia and came to New Zealand at age 17.

References

1840 births
1930 deaths
New Zealand journalists
New Zealand editors
New Zealand magazine editors
Spiritualists
Australian emigrants to New Zealand